Suhail Yusuf Khan (Hindi: सुहेल युसूफ खान; born 1988) is an Indian sarangi player and vocalist. He is the grandson of Sarangi maestro Ustad Sabri Khan (1927-2015).

In 2016, Khan released Everything Sacred, a collaborative folk album with James Yorkston and Jon Thorne under the name Yorkston/Thorne/Khan. The trio went on to release two further albums, Neuk Wight Delhi All-Stars (2017) and Navarasa: Nine Emotions (2020).

Khan is also a member of Welsh-Indian folk fusion group Khamira, who released their debut self-titled album in May 2017. The group includes Indian musicians and members of Welsh folk-jazz group Burum; both Khamira (Hindi) and Burum (Welsh) mean "yeast" in English.

References

External links
2014 profile of Khan in Forbes India's "30 Under 30"

Living people
1988 births
Sarangi players
Indian male classical musicians
People from New Delhi